Porphyry Island Provincial Park is a remote, non-operating protected area in Unorganized Thunder Bay District in northwestern Ontario, Canada. It is located on Porphyry Island off the tip of the Black Bay Peninsula on the North Shore of Lake Superior. The park features boreal forest, wetlands, and rocky shores with arctic species like encrusted saxifrage, insectivorous butterwort and the sedge. The island is also one of the few locations of devil's club east of the Rocky Mountains.

References

Sources

External links

Geography of Thunder Bay District
Provincial parks of Ontario
Parks in Thunder Bay District
Protected areas established in 1968
1968 establishments in Ontario